Paramantis togana is a species of praying mantis in the family Mantidae.

See also
List of mantis genera and species

References

Mantodea of Africa
Insects of West Africa
Insects described in 1912